In mathematics, reflection symmetry, line symmetry, mirror symmetry, or mirror-image symmetry is symmetry with respect to a reflection. That is, a figure which does not change upon undergoing a reflection has reflectional symmetry.

In 2D there is a line/axis of symmetry, in 3D a plane of symmetry. An object or figure which is indistinguishable from its transformed image is called mirror symmetric. In conclusion, a line of symmetry splits the shape in half and those halves should be identical.

Symmetric function 

In formal terms, a mathematical object is symmetric with respect to a given operation such as reflection, rotation or translation, if, when applied to the object, this operation preserves some property of the object. The set of operations that preserve a given property of the object form a group. Two objects are symmetric to each other with respect to a given group of operations if one is obtained from the other by some of the operations (and vice versa).

The symmetric function of a two-dimensional figure is a line such that, for each perpendicular constructed, if the perpendicular intersects the figure at a distance 'd' from the axis along the perpendicular, then there exists another intersection of the shape and the perpendicular, at the same distance 'd' from the axis, in the opposite direction along the perpendicular.

Another way to think about the symmetric function is that if the shape were to be folded in half over the axis, the two halves would be identical: the two halves are each other's mirror images.

Thus a square has four axes of symmetry, because there are four different ways to fold it and have the edges all match. A circle has infinitely many axes of symmetry.

Symmetric geometrical shapes

Triangles with reflection symmetry are isosceles. Quadrilaterals with reflection symmetry are kites, (concave) deltoids, rhombi, and isosceles trapezoids. All even-sided polygons have two simple reflective forms, one with lines of reflections through vertices, and one through edges.

For an arbitrary shape, the axiality of the shape measures how close it is to being bilaterally symmetric. It equals 1 for shapes with reflection symmetry, and between 2/3 and 1 for any convex shape.

Advanced types of reflection symmetry
For more general types of reflection there are correspondingly more general types of reflection symmetry. For example:

 with respect to a non-isometric affine involution (an oblique reflection in a line, plane, etc.)
 with respect to circle inversion.

In nature

Animals that are bilaterally symmetric have reflection symmetry in the sagittal plane, which divides the body vertically into left and right halves, with one of each sense organ and limb pair on either side. Most animals are bilaterally symmetric, likely because this supports forward movement and streamlining.

In architecture

Mirror symmetry is often used in architecture, as in the facade of Santa Maria Novella, Florence. It is also found in the design of ancient structures such as Stonehenge. Symmetry was a core element in some styles of architecture, such as Palladianism.

See also
 Patterns in nature
 Point reflection symmetry
 Coxeter group theory of Reflection groups in Euclidean space
 Rotational symmetry (different type of symmetry)

References

Bibliography

General

Advanced

External links

Mapping with symmetry - source in Delphi
Reflection Symmetry Examples from Math Is Fun

Elementary geometry
Euclidean symmetries